Jonatha Alves da Silva (born April 4, 1987, in Anápolis) is a Brazilian footballer currently under contract for Brazilian Série A side Coritiba.

In the Turkish 1. Lig he made thirteen games and scored against Adanaspor.

External links
  cbf.br
 
  Madureira (official side)
 Salgueiro (official side)
 Transfer from Avaí to Ferroviário
 Transfer to Anapolina

1987 births
Living people
People from Anápolis
Brazilian footballers
Expatriate footballers in Turkey
TFF First League players
Campeonato Brasileiro Série A players
Campeonato Brasileiro Série D players
Iraty Sport Club players
Gaziantep F.K. footballers
Madureira Esporte Clube players
Ferroviário Atlético Clube (CE) players
Associação Atlética Anapolina players
Avaí FC players
Rio Claro Futebol Clube players
Central Sport Club players
Rio Branco Sport Club players
Coritiba Foot Ball Club players
Esporte Clube Avenida players
Nacional Futebol Clube players
Independente Futebol Clube players
Association football forwards
Sportspeople from Goiás